Coelogyne viscosa is a species of orchid.

viscosa